Bey (former beg) is a surname. It is also a Turkish title. Notable people with this surname or title include:
 Ahmed Bey (1784–1850), the last Bey of Constantine; a nineteenth century Algerian resistance leader against the French occupation
 Andy Bey (born 1939), American jazz singer and pianist
 April Bey, American artist
 Chief Bey (1913–2004), American jazz musician
 Chris Bey (born 1996), American professional wrestler
 David Bey (born 1957), American boxer
 Dawoud Bey (born 1953), American photographer
 Djevdet Bey (1878–1955), Ottoman Albanian governor
 Erich Bey (1898–1943), German admiral during the Second World War
 Essad Bey (pen name of Lev Nussimbaum, 1905–1942), Ukrainian/Russian Jewish writer
 Mehmet Cavit Bey, Turkish economist
 Osman Hamdi Bey, Turkish painter
 Hakim Bey (pseudonym of Peter Lamborn Wilson, born 1945), American anarchist and writer
 Richard Bey (born 1951), American talk show host in the 1990s
 Saddiq Bey (born 1999), American basketball player
 Şahin Bey, Turkish revolutionary
 Salome Bey (1939–2020), American-born Canadian singer-songwriter, composer and actress
 Turhan Bey (1922–2012), Austrian born, American actor
 Tyler Bey (born 1998), American basketball player
 Yasiin Bey (better known by the stage name Mos Def, born 1973), American rap singer
 Yusef Bey (1935–2003), American Black Muslim activist
 Yusuf Bey IV (born 1986), son of Yusef Bey, convicted of murdering a journalist

See also
 Bey (disambiguation), for people with the title "Bey"
 Darrius Heyward-Bey (born 1987), American football player
 Beg Turkish title